In mathematics, a sequence of positive real numbers  is called superincreasing if every element of the sequence is greater than the sum of all previous elements in the sequence.

Formally, this condition can be written as
 
for all n ≥ 1.

Example 
For example, (1, 3, 6, 13, 27, 52) is a superincreasing sequence, but (1, 3, 4, 9, 15, 25) is not. The following Python source code tests a sequence of numbers to determine if it is superincreasing:

sequence = [1, 3, 6, 13, 27, 52]
total = 0
test = True
for n in sequence:
    print("Sum: ", total, "Element: ", n)
    if n <= total:
        test = False
        break
    total += n

print("Superincreasing sequence? ", test)

This produces the following output:

 Sum:  0 Element:  1
 Sum:  1 Element:  3
 Sum:  4 Element:  6
 Sum:  10 Element:  13
 Sum:  23 Element:  27
 Sum:  50 Element:  52
 Superincreasing sequence?  True

See also 
 Merkle-Hellman knapsack cryptosystem

References 

Cryptography